The Plaza de Armas of San Juan is one of the main squares in San Juan, the capital of Puerto Rico. It is located on San José Street in Old San Juan, and was designed to serve as the original main square for the city. San Juan City Hall is located to the north of the square, while the Puerto Rico Department of State lies at the west.

The square's main feature is a round fountain with four marble statues representing "The Four Seasons",  originally placed in the four corners of the square, which had been commissioned in 1856 to the "motherland", to be placed in Paseo La Princesa esplanade in Old San Juan.

The four seasons fountain

References

External links

San Juan on Welcome to Puerto Rico
Historia de San Juan

Tourist attractions in San Juan, Puerto Rico
Buildings and structures in San Juan, Puerto Rico
Squares in Puerto Rico
Old San Juan, Puerto Rico